Mersin International Music Festival, merfest for short, is a music festival held annually in Mersin, Turkey. In addition to Turkish artists, performers from Spain, Italy, United States, Hungary, Germany, France, Russia, Japan and Korea have participated in the festival.

History 
Mersin International Music Festival is a 
non-governmental project sponsored  by private companies, Mersin University, local municipalities and the Ministry of Culture and Tourism. It was established in 2002 and organized until 2007 by Mersin Cultural Society. Since 2008, Mersin Art Activities Society organizes the event. In 2007, the festival became a member of the European Festivals Association (EFA).

Concert venues 
Most of the concerts are held in the halls of Mersin Cultural Center (Mersin Halkevi), Congress and Exhibition Center, Uğur Oral Cultural Center and Mersin University's Amphitheater. However, every year one concert is held at St Paulus Church in Tarsus and another one at Kanlıdivane, being an outdoor concert.

2010 programme 
The programme of 2010 Mersin International Music Festival was as follows:

İdil Biret (piano) with the Mersin State Opera and Ballet Orchestra under Myron Romanul
Group Lock Out (former Bumerang)
Group Turkuaz
Trio Libero/Ankara Trombone quartet
Yıldız İbrahimova (jazz singer) with Girift Trio (consisting of Tahir Aydoğdu, Bilgin Canaz and Çetin Bilge Akıncı)
Satoko Tanaka (soprano), Satoko Kato (co-player, piano) and Satoko Inoue (piano)
Jozsef Lendvay (violin) ensemble
Denyce Graves (mezzo-soprano) with the Bilkent Symphony Orchestra under Işın Metin
Ilya Gringolts (violin) with the Bilkent Symphony Orchestra under Işın Metin
Jass a Turca Quartet
Jassing Flamenco
The Ahn Trio

See also

Mediterranean Opera and Ballet Club
İçel Sanat Kulübü
Mersin Citrus Festival

References 

Music festivals established in 2002
Culture in Mersin
Music festivals in Turkey
Annual events in Turkey
Classical music festivals in Turkey
Jazz festivals in Turkey
Tourist attractions in Mersin
2002 establishments in Turkey